Strict Scrutiny is a podcast focusing on the Supreme Court of the United States and its associated legal culture. It is hosted by Leah Litman, Melissa Murray, and Kate Shaw. Litman is an assistant professor of law at the University of Michigan Law School, Murray is a professor of law at New York University School of Law, and Shaw is Professor of Law at the Benjamin N. Cardozo School of Law. The podcast debuted in 2019 and was acquired by Crooked Media in January 2022. In January 2023, it was nominated for an Ambie Award in the category "Best Politics or Opinion Podcast".

The podcast originally also included appellate lawyer Jaime Santos, who eventually left the show.  This "fifth Beatle" is not referenced on the current show, and many are not aware of her earlier involvement.

References

External links

2019 podcast debuts
Crooked Media
Law podcasts
Audio podcasts
Political podcasts